Kentwan Kenneth Smith is a Bahamian professional basketball player for Basket club Garonne Asptt Basket (nationale 2, France).

Early years
Smith attended Piney Woods Country Life School, where he led his team to the 2011 State 2A championships, the first time since 1996

College career
Smith first attended University of Louisiana at Lafayette where he contributed 2.2 points and 1.7 rebounds in 7.4 minutes per game. Smith then transferred to Otero Junior College where he would then play 33 games and started 21 games as a sophomore. He contributed 10.4 points, 5.2 rebounds, and 2.1 assists per game. Smith would finish his college career with the Stetson Hattars where he would average 11.6 points 5.9 rebounds and 1.3 assists a game over his tenure at Stetson.

Personal life
Smith is the son of Charlene and Kenneth Smith. He has 3 sisters.

References

Living people
1991 births